Ardea was the name of at least two ships of the Italian Navy and may refer to:

 , a  launched in 1907 and discarded in 1923.
 , a  seized by Germany and renamed UJ 2225. She was scuttled incomplete in 1945.

Italian Navy ship names